The pygmy brown-toothed shrew (Chodsigoa parva) is a species of shrew in the order Eulipotyphla. It is distributed in China.
C. parva was initially thought to be the same as Chodsigoa lamula, but it was found to be a separate species.

References

Red-toothed shrews
Taxa named by Glover Morrill Allen
Mammals described in 1923